Oxford is a federal electoral district in Ontario, Canada, that has been represented in the House of Commons of Canada since the 1935 election.

It consists of the County of Oxford and a small portion of the County of Brant.

History

It was created in 1933 when the ridings of Oxford North and Oxford South were merged. It consisted initially of the county of Oxford, including the part of the village of Tavistock that lies in the county of Oxford.

In 1966, it was expanded to include the Town of Tillsonburg and the whole of the Village of Tavistock. In 1976, it was defined as consisting of the County of Oxford. In 1987, it was expanded to include the Township of Burford in the County of Brant. In 1996, it was defined as consisting of the county of Oxford.

This riding gained territory from Brant during the 2012 electoral redistribution.

Members of Parliament

Election results

				

Note: Conservative vote is compared to the total of the Canadian Alliance vote and Progressive Conservative vote in 2000 election.

	

Note: Canadian Alliance vote is compared to the Reform vote in 1997 election.
				

	

	
				

				

	

	
		

					

								

	

Note: Progressive Conservative vote is compared to "National Government" vote in 1940 election.

Note: "National Government" vote is compared to Conservative vote in 1935 election.

See also
 List of Canadian federal electoral districts
 Past Canadian electoral districts

References

 
Riding history from the Library of Parliament
 2011 results from Elections Canada
 Campaign expense data from Elections Canada

Notes

Ontario federal electoral districts
Ingersoll, Ontario
Tillsonburg
Woodstock, Ontario